Edward Allin (c.1720–1795) was an 18th century shipbuilder (and designer) to the Royal Navy mainly based at Portsmouth Dockyard and Chatham Dockyard. He is most notable as the master shipwright of HMS Victory Nelson's flagship.

Life
He first appears in Royal Navy records as a Master Caulker at Chatham Dockyard in 1750. In 1751 he became Assistant Master Shipwright at Woolwich Dockyard but after only a few months moved back to Chatham Dockyard. Promoted to Master Shipwright in 1752 he took over Sheerness Dockyard then Woolwich in March 1753.

In 1755 he replaced Peirson Lock as Master Shipwright of Portsmouth (Peirson had succeeded to Joseph Allin in 1742.

In 1762 he relocated to Chatham Dockyard with his role at Portsmouth being filled by Thomas Bucknall. He left Chatham in July 1767, pensioned off by the Royal Navy. Given this relatively early retiral he had possibly been injured and disabled.

He relocated to the south of Ireland around 1770 and he (or his son) was declared a Freeman of Cork on 22 April 1784.

He died in Cork in 1795.

Ships built 

HMS Dunkirk 60-gun ship of the line launched at Woolwich Dockyard in 1754
HMS Happy 8-gun sloop launched at Woolwich Dockyard in 1754
HMS Squirrel 20-gun ship launched at Woolwich Dockyard in 1755
HMS Dorsetshire 68-gun ship of the line launched at Portsmouth Dockyard in 1757
HMS Chatham 50-gun ship of the line launched at Portsmouth Dockyard in 1758 (designed by his father Joseph Allin in his capacity as Surveyor to the Navy)
HMS Pearl 32-gun frigate launched at Chatham Dockyard in 1762
HMS Ramillies 74-gun ship of the line launched at Chatham Dockyard in 1763
HMS Ferret 6-gun cutter launched at Chatham Dockyard in 1763
HMS Victory 100-gun ship of the line launched at Chatham Dockyard in 1765
HMS London 90-gun ship of the line launched at Chatham Dockyard in 1766

Ships designed
HMS Royal George (1756)
HMS Montagu (1757) designed in 1751

References
 

1795 deaths
People from Chatham-Kent
English shipbuilders